Neal Layton  is a British illustrator of children's books including Oscar and Arabella (2002) and Bartholomew and the Bug (2004) which won both the Nestlé Smarties Book Prize Bronze Awards.

Education 

He was born in Chichester. He has a BA in  Graphic Design (Northumbria University) and a MA in  Illustration (Central Saint Martins).

Career

He is best known for his association with Cressida Cowell as the illustrator of the Emily Brown books. The Rabbit Belongs to Emily Brown appeared on the Booktrust Best 100 Children's Book list from the last 100 years.

Amongst a great many others, he illustrated Where the Bugaboo Lives, an interactive choose your own adventure story by Sean Taylor, which won the Hampshire Illustrated Book Award and the Coventry Inspiration Book Award. It is now a Little Angel Theatre production.

Neal now lives in Portsmouth.

See also

References

External links
 
 https://www.theguardian.com/books/2019/jun/02/children-picture-book-reviews-viviane-schwarz-neal-layton-kjartan-poskitt-alex-willmore

British illustrators
British children's book illustrators
Living people
Date of birth missing (living people)
Alumni of the University of the Arts London
Alumni of Northumbria University
Year of birth missing (living people)
People from Chichester